Sirajul Islam (born 1941) is a Bangladeshi educator.

Sirajul Islam may also refer to:

Arts and entertainment 
 Serajul Islam Choudhury (born 1936), Bangladeshi literary critic
 Sirajul Islam (actor) (1938–2015), Bangladeshi actor
 Sirajul Islam of the pair Mujibur and Sirajul, known for their appearances on The Late Show with David Letterman

Educator 
 Muhammad Sirazul Islam, 2nd Vice Chancellor of the Islamic University, Bangladesh (IU)
 A. K. M. Sirazul Islam Khan, 1st Vice-Chancellor of Jagannath University.

Politician 
 Sirajul Islam (politician) (death 2012), Bangladeshi politician and freedom fighter
 Md. Sirajul Islam (1953–2020) Bangladeshi politician and freedom fighter
 Sirajul Islam Chowdhury (politician),  former Member of Parliament of Chittagong-11
 Sirajul Islam Sarder,  Jatiya Sangsad member Pabna-4
 Sirajul Islam (Chittagong politician),  Member of Parliament of Chittagong-10 constituency